Evert Vilhelm Johansson (9 September 1903 – 2 May 1990) was a Finnish canoeist who competed in the 1936 Summer Olympics.

He was born and died in Porvoon maalaiskunta, Eastern Uusimaa.

In 1936 he finished fifth in the K-1 10000 metre competition.

References
Sports-reference.com profile

1903 births
1990 deaths
People from Porvoo
Canoeists at the 1936 Summer Olympics
Finnish male canoeists
Olympic canoeists of Finland
Sportspeople from Uusimaa